The 2007–08 Ball State Cardinals men's basketball team was an NCAA Division I college basketball team competing in the Mid-American Conference.

Coaching staff
 Billy Taylor – Head coach
 Jim Molinari – Assistant coach
 Joseph Price – Assistant coach
 Bob Simmons – Assistant coach
 Jay Newberry – Director of Basketball Operations

Preseason
Billy Taylor replaced Ronny Thompson as head coach of the team. Only Peyton Stovall, Brandon Lampley, Anthony Newell and Rashaun McLemore (who redshirted) would return from last year's team.

Roster

Walk-on players are italicized.

Schedule

Awards

Mid-American Conference Player of the Week
 Peyton Stovall, January 7

References

Ball State Cardinals men's basketball seasons
Ball State